Baker Creek State Park is located adjacent to Lake Thurmond, near the town of McCormick in the county of McCormick, South Carolina. The park sits on land leased in 1967 from the US Army Corps of Engineers.

Amenities in the park include two campgrounds, a lakefront pavilion, boat ramps for access to the lake and picnic shelters. The park is home to a nature trail where wildlife such as deer, waterfowl and wild turkeys can be observed. Mountain biking and hiking are popular activities on a 10-mile trail (16 km) that winds through the park.

See also 
 List of South Carolina state parks

References

External links

Hiking/mountain bike trail

State parks of South Carolina
Protected areas of McCormick County, South Carolina